Fatma Kara Şahinbaş (born Fatma Kara; 15 June 1991) is a Turkish women's football midfielder, who  plays in Turkish Women's Football Super League for Fenerbahçe. She is a member of the Turkish national team.

Early life
Fatma Kara was born in Herten district of Recklinghausen in North Rhine-Westphalia, Germany on June 15, 1991. Her father Hasan Kara is a Turkish immigrant. Her parents, initially, did not allow her to play football. The father of her German schoolmate, however, succeeded to convince the parents. At the age of nine, Kara entered the local football club JK SpVgg. Herten.

Her three-year younger sister Ayşe Kara is also a footballer, who  follows her footsteps.

Playing career

Club

Fatma Kara played in Germany for the hometown club 1. FFC Recklinghausen in the German Regionalliga West. In the 2008–09 season, she moved to SG Lütgend Dortmund upon an offer to accomplish her high school education there. The next season, she joined TuS Harpen.

After her graduation, she moved to Turkey, and signed for Trabzonspor. She scored nine goals in 22 matches she appeared with Trabzonspor. After playing one season, the women's side of the club dissolved, and she transferred to the rival club Trabzon İdmanocağı in the 2010–11 season. In the two seasons with Trabzon İdmanocağı, Kara netted 10 goals in 40 appearances.

On January 10, 2014, Kara was transferred by the Istanbul-based club Ataşehir Belediyespor.

After four seasons by Ataşehir Belediyespor, she transferred to Beşiktaş J.K. in the 2017–18 season.

In May 2018, Kara signed with the Reykjavík-based club HK/Víkingur of the Icelandic women's league Úrvalsdeild kvenna. She scored two goals in 17 matches of the 2018 season for her team. In November 2019, Kara signed with ÍBV. After one season in Vestmannaeyjar, Kara returned to her initial club 1. FFC Recklinghausen 2003 in the German Frauen-Regionalliga West, for which she had played until 2009.

International

In 2007 still living in Germany, she was called up for the Turkey girls' U-17 national team, and made her debut in the friendly match against the Azeri team on May 27. Until October 2007, she capped ten times in the youth national team, and participated also at the 2008 UEFA Women's U-17 Championship qualification round matches.

Fatma Kara debuted in the Turkey U-19 national team in the friendly match against Maceonian juniors on September 16, 2007. She capped 32 times until April 2010, and played in the 2008, 2009 and 2010 qualification matches of UEFA Women's Under-19 Championship.

Kara appeared for the first time in the women's national team playing against Azerbaijan team in the UEFA Support International Tournament on May 11, 2009. She also took part in the 2011 FIFA Women's World Cup qualification – UEFA Group 5 and UEFA Women's Euro 2013 qualifying – Group 2 matches. As of end September 2014, she capped 25 times in the national team scoring 4 goals.

International goals

Career statistics

Honors
 Verbandsliga Westfalen
 1. FFC Recklinghausen
 Winners (1): 2008–09

 Turkish Women's First Football League
 Ataşehir Belediyespor
 Runners-up (3): 2013–14, 2014–15, 2015–16

 Beşiktaş J.K.
 Runners-up (1): 2017–18

References

External links

 

Living people
1991 births
German people of Turkish descent
People from Herten
Sportspeople from Münster (region)
Turkish women's footballers
Turkey women's international footballers
Women's association football midfielders
Trabzonspor women's players
Trabzon İdmanocağı women's players
Ataşehir Belediyespor players
Beşiktaş J.K. women's football players
Turkish expatriate women's footballers
Expatriate women's footballers in Iceland
Fatma Kara
Footballers from North Rhine-Westphalia
Fenerbahçe S.K. women's football players
Turkish Women's Football Super League players